Tomicini are a tribe of bark beetles, highly specialized weevils of the subfamily Scolytinae. They belong to the  group of tribes around the Hylesinini, which are all included in these by some authors. In this case, the Tomicini become a subtribe Tomicina.

This tribe contains a number of notorious pests, in particular of conifers; even by bark beetle standards, some Tomicini are unusually destructive and can cause massive amounts of damage during outbreaks. Some Tomicini have spread from their native range with shipments of forestry produce and established themselves as invasive species.

Genera 
 Chaetoptelius
 Dendroctonus
 Dendrotrupes
 Hylurdrectonus
 Hylurgonotus
 Hylurgopinus
 Hylurgus
 Pachycotes
 Pseudohylesinus
 Pseudoxylechinus
 Sinophloeus
 Tomicus (= Blastophagus, Myelophilus)
 Xylechinosomus
 Xylechinus

References 

Scolytinae
Beetle tribes